Agaradahalli  is a village in the southern state of Karnataka, India. It is located in the Bhadravati taluk of Shimoga district in Karnataka.

See also
 Shimoga
 Districts of Karnataka

References

External links
 http://Shimoga.nic.in/

Villages in Shimoga district